Atzompa may refer to:

San Gregorio Atzompa, Puebla
San Juan Atzompa, Puebla
Santa María Atzompa, Oaxaca
Soledad Atzompa, Veracruz

Others
Green glazed pottery of Atzompa (Oaxaca)